E-Tower is a 37-storey skyscraper located in Vila Olímpia neighborhood, near Marginal Pinheiros, in the Brazilian city of São Paulo. At 148 metres, it is the 17th-tallest skyscraper in the city, with a postmodern architecture inspired by the Westend Tower in Frankfurt. Its original project was taller, but due to the intense traffic of helicopters in the region it had to be changed. It is the 4th most modern skyscraper in São Paulo.

Concrete resistance 
E-Tower has the world record for concrete resistance, with a 10 metres floor-to-ceiling high lobby. The building was projected to the resistance concrete fck = 80 MPa, so that the four underground levels' pillars could have their dimensions reduced without losing their resistance capacity. The reduction of the pillars section allowed a higher number of parking spaces. The compression resistance achieved was considered a national record.

Usage 
It is composed of three different volumes. From 3rd to 7th floor, each floor has 1100m² of net area; from the 8th to the 19th floor, each floor has 850m² of net area; and from the 22nd to the 37th floor, each floor has 550m² of net area. Features of the building include a heated swimming pool in the 37th floor, an auditorium for 100 people on the ground level, a fitness centre on the 20th floor, a restaurant on the 21st floor, and a helipad on the roof.

Gallery

See also 
 List of tallest buildings in São Paulo
 List of tallest buildings in Brazil
 Postmodern architecture

References

External links 
 Emporis
 SkyscraperPage

Office buildings completed in 2005
Skyscrapers in São Paulo
Skyscraper office buildings in Brazil